The Minister for Agriculture and Food is a position in the Cabinet of Western Australia. The minister is responsible for the Department of Agriculture and Food, and usually holds several other portfolios.

The responsibilities now incorporated in the portfolio were originally held by the Colonial Secretary, and it was not until the 1904 Daglish Ministry that a separate Minister for Agriculture was appointed, with the inaugural minister being the nominally independent John Drew. From its first implementation through to the 1920s, and sporadically afterward, the titles of Minister for Agriculture and Minister for Lands were generally held by the same person, although the positions were legally separate, and were quite different in scope. A similar situation has existed since the late 1970s with the Fisheries and Forests portfolios. The minister's title was simply "Minister for Agriculture" until 1993, when Monty House was made Minister for Primary Industries in the Court–Cowan Ministry. The current title was implemented in 2005.

The current Minister for Agriculture and Food is Alannah MacTiernan of the Labor Party. The previous Minister for Agriculture and Food was Mark Lewis of the Liberal Party. Lewis was only the third Liberal to hold the position – in previous Coalition governments, the position has been reserved for members of the National Party (and its predecessors).

List of Ministers for Agriculture and Food
Thirty three people have been appointed as Minister for Agriculture and Food (or equivalent) in Western Australia, with Crawford Nalder's 11 years and 335 days the longest time period in the position. In the table below, members of the Legislative Council are designated "MLC". All others were members of the Legislative Assembly at the time of their service. In Western Australia, serving ministers are entitled to be styled "The Honourable", and may retain the style after three years' service in the ministry.

References

Agriculture
Ministers, Agriculture
Western Australia
Agriculture in Western Australia